Samantha Youssef is a Canadian character animator, and animation director. She has worked in both feature films and video games for Walt Disney Animation, Filmax, and Ubisoft.

Early life 
Samantha Youssef was born in Montreal, Quebec. Both of her parents are surgeons. She attended ballet classes at the Royal Academy of Dance and Canada's National Ballet School.

Career 
After submitting her portfolio to Sheridan College, Youssef got accepted and was one of four women in her college course. Samantha Youssef graduated from Sheridan College where she majored in Animation.

Samantha Youssef was a character animator for The Walt Disney Company, and has also worked for Ubisoft, Filmax Animation, and Yowza! Animation.  She is also responsible for the artistic training of many Montreal video game studios, such as BioWare, Electronic Arts, Visceral Games, and Ubisoft Montreal.

She is the Artistic Director and founder of Studio Technique, an artistic production and training studio in Montreal focused on feature film and video game animation. In 2011, the studio received a $10,000 grant from the Pepsi Refresh Project.

On March 7, 2015, Youssef launched a successful Kickstarter campaign for her first figure drawing book "The Youssef Drawing Syllabus Movement & Form."

Recognition 

Youssef was one of Wired Magazine'''s Sexiest Geeks of 2009 and 2010. She was also one of MSN techno's top sexiest geeks. According to her Wired geek nomination, she is a fan of J. R. R. Tolkien, Star Wars, and World of Warcraft. Her reaction to the nomination was mixed, stating "It's flattering, in a way, but it's also a concern when you work in a male-dominated field. When you're a petite girl, people don't always take you seriously."

She was also featured in Chatelaine (magazine) as Miss Chatelaine in 2011.

Youssef was selected as an animation jury member in the Canadian Interactive Academy for the Canadian Game Development Talent Awards.

Youssef was a jury member for Viewster's Global Film Festival, the Viewster Online Film Fest #VOFF5: Animated Worlds."'Warm Snow' wins VOFF animation prize" - Screen Daily

Youssef's animated short film La Fuga Grande (The Great Escape) was an award winner at the Toronto International Film Festival, and has been showcased at other film festivals in Canada.

 Filmography Till Eulenspiegel (2003)El Cid: La leyenda (2003)Tarzan II (2005) (V)Lilo & Stitch 2 (2005) (V)Kronk's New Groove (2005)Bambi II (2006)Curious George (2006)The Girl Who Hated Books (2006)Brother Bear 2 (2006)La Fuga Grande (2007)Enchanted (film) (2007)Nocturna (2007)The Princess and the Frog (2009)Le jour des corneilles (2011)The Day of the Crows (2012)Steamboat Willie Redux'' (2013)
Rogue One: A Star Wars Story (2016)

Bibliography 
 The Youssef Drawing Syllabus Movement & Form

References

External links
"Live Stream with Samantha Youssef - CG Con White Conference" - CG Con
Studio Technique Youtube Channel
Interview with Samantha Youssef (Artistic Director)
Samantha Youssef - Toon Talks Podcast Episode 13
A Conversation With Samantha Youssef
Movement & Form The Youssef Drawing Syllabus Volume 1

Living people
Canadian animated film directors
Walt Disney Animation Studios people
Canadian animation studios
Video game developers
Artists from Montreal
Film directors from Montreal
Sheridan College alumni
Canadian women animators
Women video game developers
Year of birth missing (living people)